was an airport in Nishi Ward, located  southwest of Hiroshima City, Japan.

History
Hiroshima's first airport, opened on a nearby island in Naka-ku, Hiroshima in 1940. It was largely destroyed during the atomic bombing of Hiroshima in 1945, but was used during the occupation of Japan as a radar base by the Royal Australian Air Force 111 Mobile Fighter Control Unit, and through the 1950s as a landing field for gliders and single-engine piston aircraft.

Following the end of World War II, the Japanese government approved a plan for a new airport in a location which could take advantage of Hiroshima's natural river topography to keep aircraft from flying over residential areas. Hiroshima Airport opened on September 15, 1961, and was initially managed by the Ministry of Transport.

The runway was extended from 1200 meters to 1800 meters in 1972. All Nippon Airways began Boeing 737 jet service to the airport in 1979, followed by Boeing 767 service in 1983. Further extensions were necessary to support large jet service, and the airport's location made this impossible. A new Hiroshima Airport was built outside the city in 1993. The old Hiroshima Airport was then renamed Hiroshima–Nishi Airport and fell under the control of Hiroshima Prefecture.

J-Air was based at Hiroshima–Nishi from 1991 until 2005, originally as a division of the JAL Flight Academy, and provided commuter service to domestic airports using Jetstream 31 and then Bombardier CRJ-200 aircraft. Japan Air Commuter continued to offer commuter service using Saab 340 aircraft since then until 2010, when the service was terminated as part of the corporate restructuring of its parent company Japan Airlines. Some air taxi services also operates until early 2013 when the airport ceased all operations.

Hiroshima City and Hiroshima Prefecture officials debated the future of the airport for several years in the early 2000s. City officials sought to keep the airport open in order to boost the city's economy, while prefectural officials preferred converting the southern part of the property into a heliport and building an extension of the Hiroshima South Road through the northern part. Following JAC's withdrawal from the airport, Hiroshima City legislators proposed converting the airport into a municipal airport. The ordinance proposal was rejected by the city assembly in March 2011, and a new mayor announced in May that the airport would be converted to a heliport by 2012, in line with the prefecture's original proposal. However, this plan seems to be stalled as of early 2015, though some progress had been made up to 2013. From 2014 there was a strictly limited daily time window for helicopter services to be operated out of the former airport.

References

External links
 
 

Defunct airports in Japan
Transport in Hiroshima Prefecture
Buildings and structures in Hiroshima
Airports established in 1961
Airports disestablished in 1993
Airports disestablished in 2012
1961 establishments in Japan
1993 disestablishments in Japan
2012 disestablishments in Japan